National Kaohsiung Center for the Arts, also known as Weiwuying,, is located in Fengshan District, Kaohsiung, Taiwan and has been acknowledged as the largest performance arts center under one roof in the world while owning the largest pipe organ in Asia. The site was originally a military compound and was reconstructed as an arts centre. With its 14,000 square meter complex, the arts centre contains four indoor performance halls and an amphitheater for outdoor performances.

History
Weiwuying Metropolitan Park was once a recruitment base as the Southern part of Taiwan and a deserted military training base during the Qing dynasty and Japanese colonial period. However, the Military Council of Nationalist Kuomintang (KMT) determined that the camp was no longer suitable for military purposes in 1979, which led to the evacuation of the camp. In 2003, the project was initiated by the Executive Yuan in hopes of transforming the area into a national performance center as a part of the top ten stimulus projects of the country. The preparatory office was set up by the Cultural Construction Committee of the Executive Yuan on 15 March 2006. In 2007, the design firm Mecanoo Architecten won the design and construction rights. The construction for the main building was completed in 2012.

Architecture
National Kaohsiung Center for the Arts is designed by Francine Houben in a Dutch architectural firm Mecanoo. The center was built on 9.9 hectares of land covering 3.3 hectares of floor area. The design was inspired by the banyan trees and their canopies of leaves around the park. The open structure of the architecture is designed to cooperate with the subtropical climate in Taiwan, allowing wind to flow between the interior and exterior spaces. The center includes four indoor venues, which are the Opera House, Concert Hall, Playhouse, and Recital Hall. There is also an amphitheater located at the south side of the building and adjacent to Weiwuying Metropolitan Park.

Opera House 
The Opera House consists of 2236 seats and is mainly used for large-scale performances, such as operas, dances, drama productions, and interdisciplinary performances. The name "Opera"  refers to all types of performing arts on stage instead of just opera performances. It is the first house in Taiwan with an installation of a mainframe computer to assist in staging operation. The seat arrangement is in a horseshoe shape, where the ground floor is divided into four areas with short partition walls while the second and third levels feature horizontal lines. The color of the seats is a mixture of red and purple along with Taiwanese flowers.

Concert Hall 
The Concert Hall consists of 1981 seats, featuring a stepped vineyard style that encircles the stage and terraces at different floor heights that surrounds the podium. Acoustic shells are hung above the stage that can be lowered or raised with three pre-set positions at 9, 14, and 17.8 meters, depending on the musical performances and the band sizes. The height and angle of the acoustic shells can be adjusted for quality sound control. Within the Concert Hall, the pipe organ is produced by the century-old German manufacturer Johannes Klais Orgelbau. It is considered the largest pipe organ in Taiwan, with 9,085 pipes, including the symphonic and echo organ.

Playhouse 
The Playhouse is mainly for various drama and dance performances. The stage can be configured into a proscenium with an orchestra pit elevator that holds 1,231 seats or a thrust stage accommodating 1,067 Mecanoo Blue seats. A Dutch theater consulting firm delivers its overall design while an Austrian firm, Waagner-Biro, constructs, manufactures, and installs it. With computer assistance, there are eight sets of elevating platforms and removable seats that allows the stage to be set to a thrust stage, seating area, or partial seating area with an orchestra pit.

Recital Hall 
The Recital Hall consists of 434 seats with golden fabric and oak lines, which is mainly for chamber music, recitals, or smaller performances based on its asymmetrical composition. The design is a variation of the traditional shoebox style, where there is a lower wall separating the center of the seating area. The upper half of the Recital Hall is surrounded by an entire circle of sound-absorbing drapery that is behind the perforated wooden panels. The sound-absorption can be adjusted accordingly to meet the needs of various types of performances while the size of the drapery is depended on the performance genres.

Awards 

 Idea-Tops Award, 2017
 New York Design Awards, 2018
 Architizer A+ Awards, 2019
 International Architecture Awards, 2020

Transportation
The art center is accessible from Weiwuying Station of Kaohsiung MRT.

Gallery

See also
 National Theater and Concert Hall
 National Taichung Theater
 List of tourist attractions in Taiwan

References

External links

 

2018 establishments in Taiwan
Art centers in Kaohsiung
Buildings and structures completed in 2018
Postmodern architecture in Taiwan